Arthur Joseph Rooney Sr. (January 27, 1901 – August 25, 1988), often referred to as "the Chief", was the founding owner of the Pittsburgh Steelers, an American football franchise in the National Football League (NFL), from 1933 until his death.  Rooney is a member of the Pro Football Hall of Fame, was an Olympic qualifying boxer, and was part or whole owner in several track sport venues and Pittsburgh area pro teams.  He was the first president of the Pittsburgh Steelers from 1933 to 1974, and the first chairman of the team from 1933 to 1988.

Family history
Rooney's great-grandparents, James and Mary Rooney, were Irish Catholics who emigrated from Newry in County Down, Ireland to Canada during the Great Famine in the 1840s. While living in Montreal, the Rooneys had a son, Arthur (who would become Art Rooney's grandfather). James and Mary later moved to Ebbw Vale, Wales, where the iron industry was flourishing, taking their son Arthur, then 21, with them. This Arthur Rooney married Catherine Regan (who was also Irish Catholic), in Wales, and they had a son, Dan. Two years after Dan Rooney was born, the family moved back to Canada and eventually ended up in Pittsburgh, Pennsylvania in 1884. Along the way the family grew to include nine children of which Dan was the second.

Dan Rooney remained in the Pittsburgh area, and eventually opened a saloon in the Monongahela Valley coal town of Coulter, Pennsylvania (or Coultersville). This is where Dan Rooney met and wed Margaret "Maggie" Murray, who was the daughter of a coal miner, and where the couple's first son, Arthur Joseph Rooney, was born. Dan and Maggie would eventually settle their family in Pittsburgh's North Side in 1913, where they bought a three-story building at the corner of Corey Street and General Robinson Street. Dan operated a cafe and saloon out of the first floor with the family living above. The building was located just a block from Exposition Park, which had been home to the Pittsburgh Pirates baseball team until 1909.

Education and athletics
Rooney attended St. Peter's Catholic School in Pittsburgh, Duquesne University Prep School, then several semesters at Indiana Normal School before completing a final year at Temple University on an athletic scholarship.  After graduation, he dedicated himself to sports, winning the AAU welterweight belt in 1918 and tried out for the 1920 Olympic Team, he played minor league baseball for both the Flint, Michigan "Vehicles" and the Wheeling, West Virginia "Stogies".  In 1925 he served as Wheeling's player-manager and led the Middle Atlantic League in games, hits, runs, stolen bases and finished second in batting average (his brother Dan Rooney, Wheeling's catcher that year, finished third).  Art also played halfback for the semi-pro Pittsburgh "Hope Harvey" and "Majestic Radio" clubs which he later took over and renamed the J.P. Rooneys before purchasing an NFL franchise for $2,500 in 1933.

Pittsburgh Steelers

Rooney's affiliation with the National Football League (NFL) began in 1933 when he paid a $2,500 franchise fee to found a club based in the city of Pittsburgh. He had named his new team the "Pirates" which was also the name of the city's long-established Major League Baseball club of which Rooney was a fan since a childhood spent in the shadow of the team's stadium.

Since the league's inception in 1920, the NFL had wanted a team in Pittsburgh due to the city's already-long history with football as well as the popularity of the Pittsburgh Panthers football team, an NCAA national championship contender during this period. The league was finally able to take advantage of Pennsylvania relaxing their blue laws that prior to 1933 prohibited sporting events from taking place on Sundays, when most NFL games take place.

In 1936, Rooney won a parlay at Saratoga Race Course, which netted him about $160,000.  He placed the bet based on a tip from New York Giants owner Tim Mara, a bookmaker. He used the winnings to hire a coach, Joe Bach, give contracts to his players and almost win a championship. The winnings funded the team until 1941 when he sold the franchise to NY playboy Alex Thompson. Thompson wanted to move the franchise to Boston so he could be within a five-hour train ride of his club. At the same time, the Philadelphia Eagles ran into financial problems. Rooney used the funds from the sale of franchise to get a 70% interest in the Eagles, the other 30% held by Rooney friend and future NFL commissioner, Bert Bell. Bell and Rooney agreed to trade places with Thompson. Bell took the role of President of the Steelers that he relinquished to Rooney in 1946 when Bell became Commissioner. Rooney got his good friend and his sister's father in law, Barney McGinley, to buy Bell's shares. Barney's son Jack, Art's brother in law, retained the McGinley interest that passed to his heirs when he died in 2006.

Rooney sent shock waves through the NFL by signing Byron "Whizzer" White to a record-breaking $15,000 contract in 1938. This move, however, did not bring the Pirates a winning season, and White left the team for the Detroit Lions the following year. The club did not have a season above .500 until 1942, the year after they were renamed the Pittsburgh Steelers.

During World War II, the Steelers had some financial difficulties and were merged with the Philadelphia Eagles in 1943 and the Chicago Cardinals in 1944.

After the war, Rooney became team president. He longed to bring an NFL title to Pittsburgh but was never able to beat the powerhouse teams, like the Cleveland Browns and Green Bay Packers. The Steelers also struggled with playing in a city and era where baseball was king and were treated as something of a joke compared to the Pirates. The team also made some questionable personnel calls at the time such as cutting a then-unknown Johnny Unitas in training camp (Unitas would go on to a Hall of Fame career with the Baltimore Colts) and trading their first round pick in the 1965 draft to the Chicago Bears (who would draft Dick Butkus with the pick), among others.

Nevertheless, Rooney was popular with owners as a mediator, which would carry over to his son Dan Rooney. He was the only owner to vote against moving the rights of the New York Yanks to Dallas, Texas after the 1951 season due to concerns of racism in the South at the time. (Ultimately, the Dallas Texans failed after one year, and the rights were moved to Baltimore, where the team became the Baltimore Colts. The team now plays in Indianapolis.) In 1963, along with Bears owner George Halas, Rooney was one of two owners to vote for the 1925 NFL Championship to be reinstated to the long-defunct Pottsville Maroons.

Pittsburgh Penguins
As a pillar of the community in many aspects, Rooney was asked to lend his considerable influence in the city's bid to reclaim a NHL franchise during the league's expansion in 1967.  Although Pittsburgh enjoyed championship hockey with the professional but "minor league" Pittsburgh Hornets since its NHL franchise (the Pirates hockey team) disbanded in 1930 from the effects of the Great Depression, many city leaders were pushing for the region to become more "major league" suggesting that Mr. Rooney use his influence in the sports industry to have the league award Pittsburgh a franchise.  Rooney proved his worth and from 1967 until the early 1970s was a part owner of the Pittsburgh Penguins.

Homestead Grays

Track sports
Rooney also acquired the Yonkers Raceway in 1972, the Palm Beach Kennel Club, Green Mountain Kennel Club in Vermont, Shamrock Stables in Maryland and owned the Liberty Bell Park Racetrack outside Philadelphia.

Later life
Following the AFL–NFL merger in 1970, the Steelers agreed to leave the NFL Eastern Conference and joined the AFC Central Division.

Through expert scouting, the Steelers became a power. In 1972, they began a remarkable 8–year run of playoff appearances, and 13 straight years of winning seasons, including three additional playoff berths. In Rooney's 41st season as owner, the club won the Super Bowl. During Rooney's lifetime the team also had Super Bowl victories following the 1975, 1978 and 1979 seasons.  They also won the Super Bowl in the 2005 and 2008 seasons, making the Steelers the first-team following the AFL–NFL merger to win six Super Bowls.

Following the Steelers' victory in Super Bowl IX, Rooney stepped down from day-to-day management of the team, but remained the ultimate source of authority until his death. Dan, his son, took over as team president. Rooney died from complications of a stroke on August 25, 1988. An August 1987 Pittsburgh Press story stated that Rooney never missed a Hall of Fame induction ceremony in all 25 years, and that he was asked to present his third inductee, John Henry Johnson,  that month.  In memory of "The Chief," Steelers wore a patch on the left shoulder of their uniforms with Rooney's initials AJR for the entire season. The team ended up finishing 5-11, their worst record since a 1–13 showing in 1969. He is buried at the North Side Catholic Cemetery in Pittsburgh.

Legacy

In 1964, he was elected to the Pro Football Hall of Fame. Duquesne University named their football field in his honor in 1993. In 1999 Rooney ranked 81st on the Sporting News "100 Most Powerful Sports Figures of the 20th Century" list. A statue of his likeness graces the entrance to the home of the Pittsburgh Steelers, Heinz Field. The street that runs adjacent to Heinz Field on Pittsburgh's North Side is named "Art Rooney Avenue" in his honor. In 2000, he was inducted as a "pioneer" into the American Football Association's Semi-Pro Football Hall of Fame.

During Rooney's life, the Steelers would often use a late-round draft pick on a player from a local college like Pitt, West Virginia or Penn State. Though these players rarely made the team, this practice was intended to appeal to local fans and players.

Art Rooney is the subject of, and the only character in, the one-man play The Chief, written by Gene Collier and Rob Zellers.

Arthur J. Rooney was married to Kathleen Rooney née McNulty (1904–1982) for 51 years, until her 1982 death. Kathleen was the mother of Art's five sons, who are Dan Rooney, the chairman of the board of directors of the Pittsburgh Steelers and a former United States Ambassador to Ireland, Art Rooney Jr., Timothy Rooney, Patrick Rooney, and John Rooney (all also directors of the Pittsburgh Steelers). She is also the grandmother of the couple's 32 grandchildren, including current Steelers president Art Rooney II and U.S. Representative Thomas J. Rooney (R, FL-16). The couple also has about 75 great-grandchildren, including actress sisters Kate Mara and Rooney Mara.

ReferencesGeneral Specific'

Further reading

External links

 
 

1901 births
1988 deaths
People from South Versailles Township, Allegheny County, Pennsylvania
Rooney family
American people of Irish descent
American Roman Catholics
Players of American football from Pennsylvania
Duquesne Dukes football players
Pittsburgh Lyceum (football) players
Pittsburgh Steelers owners
Pittsburgh Steelers executives
Steagles players and personnel
Pittsburgh Penguins owners
Wheeling Stogies players
National Football League team presidents
National Hockey League executives
National Hockey League owners
Pro Football Hall of Fame inductees
20th-century American businesspeople
Georgetown University alumni
Burials in Pennsylvania